Porth Dafarch is a small bay on the west coast of Anglesey in North Wales. It has a sandy beach and is a popular visitor destination. In 2021 Porth Dafarch beach awarded as Blue Flag beach.

Toponym 
The origin of the Welsh name is uncertain: although some claim that the placename is a contraction of Porth Dau Farch ("Harbour of the Two Stallions"), scholars are fairly sure that this is not the case. Indeed, in documents the name has been recorded as Porth Davagh ("Davagh's Harbour") (1545), Porth Daverch (1878), Porth y Dafarch (1799), Porth y Daferch (1789), and the present Porth Dafarch (since 1838).  It has been tentatively suggested that "Tafarch" (which takes a soft mutation after porth to become "Dafarch") was a personal name, albeit not a common one.

Geology

The bay, which is roughly 100 metres across, is created from Precambrian rock that has been eroded into high cliffs and sea caves. As part of Holy Island, Anglesey, it belongs to the large geological feature known as the Monian Supergroup. It opens out southwest into the Irish Sea.

History
Porth Dafarch was used from the mid-17th to early-19th century as an alternative to the main port of Holyhead when it was affected by adverse weather conditions in the Irish Sea. Passengers would use the sheltered bay to set sail for Dublin in Ireland. However, with the commencement of a steam service in 1822 (and the construction of the Holyhead Breakwater), Porth Dafarch was no longer required as an alternative port. The old customs post can still be seen, dating from 1819. It allowed mail and passengers to be landed on Holyhead Island when Northerly winds made landing at Holyhead impossible. By 1873, the new harbour was completed at Holyhead making the customs post redundant. It has been fenced off from the public due to its poor condition but is a Grade 2 listed building.

The bay is a popular visitor destination because of its sandy beach and the opportunity for rock-pooling. 
It is also popular for watersports, particularly windsurfing, surfing, canoeing, sailing and jet skiing. Scuba divers are able to view the  Missouri, a 3000-ton vessel that was wrecked in 1886 on its way to Boston. The bay is in close proximity to campsites and the Anglesey Coastal Path.

A marine fibre-optic cable that links Ireland to the UK makes landfall at Porth Dafarch. The CeltixConnect, which consists of 72 fibre pairs, was laid over a period of about 30 days between mid-December 2011 and mid-January 2012.

References

External links 
photos of Porth Dafarch and surrounding area on geograph

Trearddur
Coast of Anglesey
Villages in Anglesey
Beaches of Anglesey
Underwater diving sites in Wales
Blue Flag beaches